aka Torasan's Tale is a 1987 Japanese comedy film directed by Yoji Yamada. It stars Kiyoshi Atsumi as Torajirō Kuruma (Tora-san), and Kumiko Akiyoshi as his love interest or "Madonna". Tora-san Plays Daddy is the 39th entry in the popular, long-running Otoko wa Tsurai yo series.

Cast
 Kiyoshi Atsumi as Torajirō
 Chieko Baisho as Sakura
 Kumiko Akiyoshi as Takako
 Midori Satsuki as Fude
 Shimojo Masami as Kuruma Tatsuzō
 Chieko Misaki as Tsune Kuruma (Torajiro's aunt)
 Gin Maeda as Hiroshi Suwa
 Hidetaka Yoshioka as Mitsuo Suwa
 Hisao Dazai as Boss (Umetarō Katsura)
 Jun Miho as Akemi
 Gajirō Satō as Genkō
 Chishū Ryū as Gozen-sama
 Yūichirō Itō as Hideyoshi
 Tatsuo Matsumura as Kikuda

Critical appraisal
Kiyoshi Atsumi won the Best Actor title at the Nikkan Sports Film Award ceremony for his role in Tora-san Plays Daddy. Nominations for the film at the Japan Academy Prize were for Best Director and Best Screenplay (Yoji Yamada), Best Supporting Actress (Kumiko Akiyoshi), and Best Sound (Isao Suzuki and Takashi Matsumoto). The German-language site molodezhnaja gives Tora-san Plays Daddy three and a half out of five stars.

Availability
Tora-san Plays Daddy was released theatrically on December 26, 1987. In Japan, the film was released on videotape in 1989 and 1996, and in DVD format in 2002, 2005, and 2008.

References

Bibliography

English

German

Japanese

External links
 Tora-san Plays Daddy at www.tora-san.jp (official site)

1987 films
Films directed by Yoji Yamada
1987 comedy films
1980s Japanese-language films
Otoko wa Tsurai yo films
Shochiku films
Films set in Nara Prefecture
Films set in Mie Prefecture
Films with screenplays by Yôji Yamada
Japanese sequel films
1980s Japanese films